Indika C. D. Dissanayake Mudiyanselage (born 6 August 1989), also known as Indika Dissanayake, is a Sri Lankan male weightlifter. He competed in the 69 kg division at the Asian Games (in 2010 and 2018), South Asian Games (in 2016) and at the Commonwealth Games (in 2010, 2014 and 2018), and won silver medals at the 2016 South Asian Games and 2018 Commonwealth Games.

Biography 
Indika was born on 6 August 1989 in Hataraliyadda,  Central Province of Sri Lanka. He attended the Menikdiwela Central College in Menikdiwela for his primary education and did his advanced level studies at the Kingswood College which is situated in Kandy. He also joined the Sri Lanka Navy in 2009.

Career 
Dissanayake claimed a silver medal at the 2016 South Asian Games. His next silver medal at the 2018 Commonwealth Games was the first silver medal for Sri Lanka at those Games. His medal was also the third medal clinched by Sri Lankan team during the Gold Coast Commonwealth Games and was also the third medal received by Sri Lanka in weightlifting category after couple of bronze medals secured by Chaturanga Lakmal and Dinusha Gomes at the 2018 Commonwealth Games.

In June 2018, Indika Dissanayake reached his highest career world ranking of 11 for the 69 kg category according to the latest world rankings revealed by the International Weightlifting Federation. This was also the highest career rating achieved by a Sri Lankan weightlifter.

Dissanayake has qualified to compete for Sri Lanka at the 2022 Commonwealth Games in Birmingham, England.

References

External links

1989 births
Sri Lankan male weightlifters
Commonwealth Games silver medallists for Sri Lanka
Commonwealth Games medallists in weightlifting
Weightlifters at the 2010 Commonwealth Games
Weightlifters at the 2014 Commonwealth Games
Weightlifters at the 2018 Commonwealth Games
Weightlifters at the 2022 Commonwealth Games
Weightlifters at the 2010 Asian Games
Weightlifters at the 2018 Asian Games
Living people
Alumni of Kingswood College, Kandy
South Asian Games silver medalists for Sri Lanka
Asian Games competitors for Sri Lanka
South Asian Games medalists in weightlifting
Sri Lankan powerlifters
20th-century Sri Lankan people
21st-century Sri Lankan people
Medallists at the 2018 Commonwealth Games